Cleavon Frendo (born 1 July 1985 in Pietà, Malta) is a professional footballer who plays as a winger.

Playing career

Cleavon started his professional career in 2000 at Pieta Hotspurs, after returning from Torino in Italy. He was loaned to Lija Athletic for the 2002–03 season. He then joined Marsaxlokk, and won the 2006–07 season of the Maltese Premier League.

In June 2008, Cleavon along with his Marsaxlokk teammate Jamie Pace left the 2006–07 champions to join the 2007–08 champions Valletta.

Frendo made his league debut for Valletta on 25 August 2008, coming on as a 76th-minute substitute for fellow new recruit Marcelo Peabirú in a 1–1 draw with Sliema Wanderers.

Cleavon's first goal for Valletta came ironically against his former club, Marsaxlokk, on 20 December 2008, when he tapped in a rebound in the 44th minute from an initial shot by Gilbert Agius that had hit the post. Valletta went on to win the match 1–0. For the 2011–12 season, he joined Sliema Wanderers.

Honours
Marsaxlokk
 Maltese Premier League: 2006–07

External links

 Malta Football Association
 Cleavon Frendo at MaltaFootball.com
 

Living people
1985 births
Maltese footballers
Malta international footballers
Pietà Hotspurs F.C. players
Lija Athletic F.C. players
Marsaxlokk F.C. players
Valletta F.C. players
People from Pietà, Malta
Association football wingers